The X-League is the top-level Gridiron football league in Japan. It was founded in 1971 as the Japan American Football League, and changed its name to the X League in 1997. There are four divisions (X1 Super, X1 Area, X2, and X3) among which there is promotion and relegation.  Teams are split into different divisions or blocks, depending on the tier. There are two types of teams, one being a company team in which only employees of that particular sponsoring company may play, and the other being a club team for which anyone can try out.
 
Game rules are based on those of the NCAA college division in the United States, with the exception of the length of quarters, which are 12 minutes instead of 15 during the first stage of the season.

The Japanese national team, which has won the first and second editions of the American Football World Cup and was runner-up, finishing second to the American team, in the 2007 installment of the tournament, was made up almost entirely of players from this league.

Americans are often recruited to play for X League teams, with a strict rule of four per team. No more than two foreign players per team are allowed on the field of play at a time.

Season format

The league is split into 4 tiers: X1 Super, X1 Area, X2 and X3.

There are two spring tournaments as well which are used by teams to ready themselves and evaluate new players before the fall season. One is the larger Pearl Bowl which teams from eastern Japan compete in, and the other is the Green Bowl for teams in western Japan.

Regular season
The top tier, X1 Super, includes 12 teams split into 2 divisions of 6 teams who play a 5 game regular season. 

The second tier, X1 Area, contains 8 teams while X2 comprises 19 teams, and X3 with 16 teams. The teams in X1 Area is divided into three groups with each team playing six games, three inside the group and three outside.

The top tier X1 Super has 2 divisions, A and B, made up of teams from all over Japan. The next league down, X1 Area, has just one division between all 8 teams. The next two leagues below, the X2 and X3, contain east, west, and central divisions. The east and central divisions comprise teams mostly in and around the Kanto area, with the west teams being in the Kansai area.

Postseason
At the end of the X1 Super season, the top four teams in each division head into the quarterfinals then the semifinals. The winners of the semifinals would advance to the Japan X Bowl.

The top two teams in the X1 Area compete in the X1 Area Bowl for the chance to advance to the Area/Super promotional matches against the  7th and 8th place X1 Super teams.

Japan X Bowl

The two semifinal winners would meet for the league championship in the Japan X Bowl held at the Tokyo Dome. Since 1987, Japan X Bowl has decided the X League championship. Until 2002, it was known as the Tokyo Super Bowl. The winner of this game goes on to the Rice Bowl to face the winner of the Koshien Bowl, the national college championship game.

Relegation and Division Replacement games
The 7th and 8th place team from X1 Super would play a relegation playoff game against the 1st and 2nd place team from the X1 Area league.

The same goes for the last place team in the X1 Area who would play the X2 champion to decide who would be the 8th team in X1 Area.

2022 X-League team organization

X1 Super

X1 Area

X2

East
Club Blue Thunders
Sony Solidstate
Warriors
Hurricanes
Ibaraki Saviors
Yokohama Harbors
Shitamachi Gorillaz

Central
AFC Cranes
Club Barbarian
Zero Fighters AFC
Wranglers
Ox Kawasaki AFC

West
Sidewinders
Nishinomiya Bruins
Club Hawkeye
Osaka Gas Skunks
Golden Fighters
TRIAXIS J-Stars

X3

East
Itochu Wings
Mitsui & Co., Ltd. Seagulls
Club Steelers
MERU-KYOEI Guardians

West

A Block
Iso Superstars
Lead Effort Ales
Club Bears
Sato Construction Standing Bears
Club Islands
Mie Firebird

B Block
Aichi Golden Wings
Toyoda Bull Fighters
Hiroshima Hawks
Tristars
Masahide Blazers
Osaka Prefectural Police Shields

Past League Results

X-League Divisional Standings since 1997

East/Central

West

Until 2008, the top 2 teams in each division qualified for the playoffs to the Japan X bowl known as the Final6. Starting 2009, the top 3 teams in each division qualified for the Super9 in the 2nd stage.

X1 Super

X1 Area East/Central

X1 Area West

Playing venues

Awards and honors

All X-League Team

Since 2000, the X-League honors outstanding players by electing them to the All X-League Team. 11 offensive players, 11 defensive players and 3 special team players are voted by the Head Coaches and 5 players on each of the 18 X1 teams to be selected for the team. Starting 2019, the All X-League team was divided between 2 classifications: The 8-team X1 Super and 12-team X1 Area with both selecting 11 offensive players, 11 defensive players and 3 special team players and are voted by the Head Coaches and 5 players on each of the teams. In 2020, the X1 Area All X League Team was expanded to include a West and East team due to the shortened season caused by the COVID-19 pandemic.

X-League Most Valuable Player (MVP) award
The X-League Most Valuable Player award (X-League MVP) is an award given to the Japanese Gridiron football player who is considered most valuable to his team in the X-League. Started in 2012, the award was divided between the best player in each division until 2014 when one overall MVP was awarded. Starting in 2019, the award was divided between the best player in each classification.

X-League Rookie of the Year (ROY) award
The X-League Rookie of the Year award (X-League ROY) is an award given to the player who is considered have made a big impact during his first year with his team. Started in 2012, the award was divided between the best player in each division until 2014 when one overall ROY was awarded. Starting in 2019, the awarded was divided between 2 classifications: X1 Super and X1 Area.

X-League Fairplay award
Since 2012, the X-League Fairplay award is awarded to the team that had accumulated the fewest penalties during the regular season.

Team names
Silver Star → Asahi Beer Silver Star
Matsushita Electric Works Impulse → Panasonic Electric Works Impulse
Kohoku Finies → Sunstar Finies → Kohoku Finies → Finies Football Club → Kobe Finies → SRC Kobe Finies　→ Elecom Kobe Finies
Recruit Seagulls → Seagulls → Obic Seagulls
NEC Falcons (dissolved in 1997)
Renown Rovers (dissolved in 2003)
Onward Oaks → Onward Skylarks(Combined with Skylark Skylarks in 2001) → Onward Oaks (dissolved in 2009)→ Sagamihara Rise (Remnants of the Onward Oaks formed a new team called the Sagamihara Rise (same uniforms and colors, although different logo) and played one level down in the X2 league through the 2010 season. They subsequently won the challenge game against the Renesas Hurricanes to move back up to X1 in December 2010, and will play again in the X1 Central Division for the 2011 season, with the Hurricanes moving down to X2)

References

External links

Japan's X-League Runs with the Ball
X League's Road to the Rice Bowl
American Football in Japan

American football leagues
Sports leagues in Japan
Professional sports leagues in Japan
American football in Japan
1971 establishments in Japan
Sports leagues established in 1971